Methylsalicylate may refer to:

 The conjugate base of any of the four isomers of methylsalicylic acid
 Methyl salicylate, the methyl ester of salicylic acid